Legislative elections were held in El Salvador on 13 March 1966. The result was a victory for the National Conciliation Party, which won 31 of the 52 seats.

Results

References

Bibliography
Political Handbook of the world, 1966. New York, 1967. 
Benítez Manaut, Raúl. 1990. "El Salvador: un equilibrio imperfecto entre los votos y las botas." Secuencia 17:71-92 (mayo-agosto de 1990).
Caldera T., Hilda. 1983. Historia del Partido Demócrata Cristiano de El Salvador. Tegucigalpa: Instituto Centroamericano de Estudios Políticos.
Eguizábal, Cristina. 1984. "El Salvador: elecciones sin democracia." Polemica (Costa Rica) 14/15:16-33 (marzo-junio 1984).
Institute for the Comparative Study of Political Systems. 1967. El Salvador election factbook, March 5, 1967. Washington: Institute for the Comparative Study of Political Systems.
Kantor, Harry. 1969. Patterns of politics and political systems in Latin America. Chicago: Rand McNally & Company.
Webre, Stephen. 1979. José Napoleón Duarte and the Christian Democratic Party in Salvadoran Politics 1960-1972. Baton Rouge: Louisiana State University Press.
Williams, Philip J. and Knut Walter. 1997. Militarization and demilitarization in El Salvador's transition to democracy. Pittsburgh: University of Pittsburgh Press.

El Salvador
Legislative elections in El Salvador
1966 in El Salvador
Election and referendum articles with incomplete results